Ulala may refer to:
Ulala (Space Channel 5), a reporter from Space Channel 5, a Japanese music video game
Ulala Serizawa, a character from Persona 2: Innocent Sin, a role-playing video game
Ulala, name of Gorno-Altaysk, a town in the Altai Republic, Russia, in 1824–1932

See also
"My Way: Ulala", a 2010 single by Japanese group Dream
Ulala Session, a K-pop boy band
University of Louisiana at Lafayette, a state university in Louisiana, United States